Femina was a French magazine created on February 1, 1901 by Pierre Lafitte and discontinued in 1954. The title gave its name to the Prix Femina from 1922.

History
The title of this illustrated periodical is taken from the Latin word femina for "woman". It was subtitled "La revue idéale de la femme et de la jeune fille" ("The ideal magazine for women and girls") and was an early French magazine format targeting a female readership of the bourgeoisie. It won immediate success; by the end of its second year, it achieved a circulation of 100,000 and reached a high of 135,000 between 1905 and 1910, triple the sales of La Fronde and outselling influential daily newspapers Le Temps (36,000), Le Figaro (46,000) and L'Éclair (93,000).

Content

Femina started as a bimonthly society magazine and before the First World War its editorial coverage was broader than other magazines aimed at women. It presented a balanced mix of reportage on fashion, the arts and current events, with generous coverage of leisure activities, especially sports (the cover of April 1, 1902, shows the photograph of two women playing ping pong and another magazine published by Lafitte, La Vie au vent, catered to women sports enthusiasts), and professional advice on interior decoration. Advertising from luxury retailers and manufacturers covered at least five pages of each issue.

Writing 
Leading journalists contributed articles, including women writers with a serious commitment to women's issues, among them being poet Jane Catulle-Mendès, and established novelists Gabrielle Réval, Jeanne Lapauze and Marcelle Tinayre. Amongst its male writers were allies of feminism: Marcel Prévost, Jules Claretie (director of the Comédie Francaise which staged several progressive plays about women), Maurice Donnay (who wrote the 1913 feminist play L’éclaireuses), Paul Margueritte (who supported divorce and the decriminalization of adultery), and literary critic Emile Faguet, sympathetic to women writers. It profiled celebrated women, including those working in the professions; as an example of its contents and inclusion of female celebrities of the day, the May 1, 1903 issue entitled "Women Artists at the Salon of 1903", devoted three illustrated pages to Louise Abbéma, Louise Catherine Breslau, Camille Claudel, Maximilian Guyon, Louise Clément-Carpeaux (cover), Laure Coutan-Montorgueil, and Juana Romani.

Imagery 
Femina projected a strong visual appeal. Current fashion in clothing and interiors was illustrated with photographs made, in the case of garments, in the studio or at social events (such as those taken at the races by the Séeberger Brothers) and hand-drawn illustrations, including instructions on fitting garments; on the correct way to remove gloves, for example. Photographic portraits played a role in engaging readers with élite society figures and unpeopled pictures of their prestige home interiors appealed to aspirational readers' curiosity. After a few years, the cover of the magazine, which was in most cases a photograph, was alternated with a bi-chrome comic illustration. In 1906, the cover of the November 1 number displayed drawing of a woman breastfeeding her child, signed by Paul César Helleu.

Reader surveys 
Readers strongly engaged with the magazine; its frequent surveys of them brought enthusiastic response; including the desirability of sport for young women, women in the army. Seven to nine thousand subscribers (about 1 in 15), and often more, would regularly take part; 14,728 readers penned their ideas on the ten qualities a woman needed to be perfect, and 13,758 readers advised on the right bride for the German crown prince. In 1909, the Académie française raised the question of the election of female members: immediately, Femina asked its readers to nominate 40 women writers, contemporary or former, who would constitute an imaginary female academy. 6,600 responded and the magazine and published on a double-page an illustration showing the 40 elected standing under the dome of the academy. To a question about their notion of what income would support  “la vie idéale" readers nominated a minimum twenty thousand francs per annum, ten times the typical salary of a teacher.

Inter-war years
On October 15, 1902, Hachette had launched a competing monthly entitled La Vie heureux, subtitled "revue féminine universelle illustrée" ("Universal Illustrated Women's Magazine"), which gave its name to a literary prize in November 1904, awarded by a jury of women of letters. 

After having suspended publication in 1917, Pierre Lafitte sold his title to Hachette, who merged it with La Vie heureux, keeping the name Femina and launching a new monthly formula in January 1922. The "Femina-La Vie Heureuse Prize" was then renamed the Prix Femina.

The magazine was then issued regularly until 1939 with Lafitte and Robert Ochs as co-editors (who became editor in 1935) and Martine Rénier as fashion editor.

After World War Two 
Femina reappeared as a luxurious version quarterly and with out-of-series editions in colour from 1945, sometimes illustrated by significant artists, before disappearing after a number dated December 1953-January 1954.

Editorial direction
Anne R. Epstein, in her review of the book by Colette Cosnier, Les Dames de Femina raises the question of the editorial orientation of the magazine, recalling that its readership was essentially composed of bourgeois women with conservative tendencies; it was expensive, generally on sale at double or more the annual subscription of most women's domestic magazines. Pierre Lafitte did not have the goal, originally, to publish a feminist magazine, but rather a women's magazine:

However, Femina was always feminine and occasionally even feminist, given that advances of that time including the suffragettes' demands in England, and achievement of the right to vote by Danish women, were issues discussed in the magazine. Francesca Berry argues that her "analysis of its interiors pages in the context of other magazines...suggests that Femina is worthy of re-evaluation from a feminist perspective, not least because the [domestic] interior is, at times, allowed to operate as a personally meaningful space for the negotiation of complex feminine subjectivities." In addition, Lafitte showcased the sporting abilities of women, launching several prizes in the context of competitions (related to golf, in particular), including the Femina Cup in 1906.

During the First World War it was published only intermittently, but in the 1920s increased its popularity as a modern magazine, displacing old-fashioned rivals such as Le Moniteur de la Mode  which closed in 1913 and new luxury titles, like the French edition of Vogue (1920-), as Femina increasingly featured high fashion and much less reportage, and by the mid-twenties was image-oriented, and concerned primarily with a modern lifestyle of seasonal leisure and fashion. Through the 1930s Femina evoked fantasy and desire before information, necessity or practicality, offering the modem woman's magazine formulae of escapist and unattainable visual spectacle to a more diverse and younger female readership.

Other titles
Version Femina (Lagardère group) is the title of an unrelated contemporary publication for women, and Femina is also the name women's magazines in Denmark, Femina (India), an Indian bimonthly, Femina (Indonesia), an Indonesian weekly, and Femina (South Africa), a monthly women's magazine published in South Africa, and one in Switzerland, as well as a women's magazine with text in Esperanto.

References

External links
 Femina years 1910-1914 [archive] 1910-1914, online on Gallica (incomplete collection)
 Femina years 1926-1938 [archive] 1926-1938, online on Gallica (incomplete collection).

French-language magazines
1901 establishments in France
1954 disestablishments in France
Magazines established in 1901
Magazines disestablished in 1954
Women's fashion magazines
Lifestyle magazines
Monthly magazines published in France
Women's magazines published in France
20th century in women's history
Feminist magazines
Defunct magazines published in France